Jose Lampe Cuisia Jr.  (born 16 July 1944) is a Filipino banker, business executive, and diplomat. He was the seventh Governor of the Central Bank of the Philippines, serving from 1990 to 1993, and formerly the Ambassador of the Republic of the Philippines to the United States of America. He is vice-chairman in the Philippine American Life and General Insurance Co., in which he had been CEO for a decade until its American owners, AIG, went bankrupt and had to sell out to Asian investors. He is also vice chairman of SM Prime Holdings. He is also a director of the Ayalas' Manila Water Co., in cement conglomerate Holcim Philippines, in call-center firm Integra Business Processing Solutions, in property firm ICCP Holdings, and in Beacon Property Ventures. Likewise, Cuisia is chairman of The Covenant Car Co.

Awards and honors

 : The Order of the Knights of Rizal - Knight Grand Cross of Rizal, KGCR (2015).

References

Governors of the Bangko Sentral ng Pilipinas
Ambassadors of the Philippines to the United States
Living people
Place of birth missing (living people)
1944 births
People from Manila
Ramos administration personnel
Corazon Aquino administration personnel
Filipino people of Spanish descent
Filipino people of German descent